Central Susquehanna Intermediate Unit #16 (CSIU), located in the Milton Industrial Park, Milton, Pennsylvania, was created by the Pennsylvania General Assembly in 1971 as one of 29 Intermediate Units in the commonwealth. Intermediate units serve a given geographic area's educational needs and function as a step of organization above that of a public school district, but below that of the Pennsylvania Department of Education. The state's goal is for IU's to meet student and community needs in a cost-effective manner by providing services best offered on a regional basis such as special education, technical education, services to public and nonpublic schools. IN 2016-17 the CSIU16 budget is $76.7 million for programs and services and $1,073,846 General operating budget.

Intermediate Units are governed by a Board of Directors, each member is also a member of a local school board from the IUs region. Board members are elected by school directors of all the region's school districts for three-year terms that begin July 1. Officers of the intermediate unit's board are selected by members of the IU board. IU board members have a separate fiduciary responsibility to the IU and are not intended to be representatives of their home districts. They are funded by school districts, state funding and federal program specific funding and grants. IUs do not have the power to tax. Annual budgets of the intermediate unit must be approved by a majority of the school boards in the districts it serves.

CSIU's primary service area consists of Columbia, Montour, Northumberland, Snyder and Union counties in central Pennsylvania, which includes 17 public school districts, three technical schools and more than 70 nonpublic schools. CSIU also markets a wide range of products and services to education and other public agencies throughout and outside Pennsylvania.

Public Schools Served

Benton Area School District
Berwick Area School District
Bloomsburg Area School District
Central Columbia School District
Danville Area School District
Lewisburg Area School District
Line Mountain School District
Midd-West School District
Mifflinburg Area School District
Millville Area School District
Milton Area School District
Mount Carmel Area School District
Selinsgrove Area School District
Shamokin Area School District
Shikellamy School District
Southern Columbia Area School District
Warrior Run School District
SusQ Cyber Charter School

Career and Technology Schools
Columbia-Montour Area Vocational-Technical School
Northumberland Co. Career & Technology Center
SUN Area Technical Institute

Non Public Schools Served

Columbia County Christian - Bloomsburg
Gospel Christian Academy - Selinsgrove
Greenwood Friends School - Millville
Heritage Christian Academy - Berwick
Hillside Christian Academy - Mifflinburg
Holy Family Consolidated School - Berwick
Maranatha Christian School - Watsontown
Meadowbrook Christian School - Milton
Meadowview Christian Academy - Paxinos
Northumberland Christian School - Northumberland
Our Lady of Lourdes Regional School - Coal Township
Penn View Christian Academy - Penns Creek
St. Columba School - Bloomsburg
St. Cyril Preschool and Kindergarten - Danville
St. Joseph School - Danville
Sunbury Christian Academy - Northumberland
Transfiguration of Our Lord School - Shamokin
Watsontown Christian Academy  - Watsontown

data taken from CSIU16 Service Directory 2009–10.

CSIU 16 Services
 Educational programs for CSIU region schools and communities
 Professional development and school improvement programs
 Computer software and services for school districts and other public agencies
 Management of Pennsylvania Trust, serving nine regional Pennsylvania trusts with 90 school employers and 30,000 staff
 Pennsylvania Education Joint Purchasing Council, a consortium-buying program serving 240 members in five states, which saves schools and other public entities $6.3 million per year in purchases
 PEPPM, a technology bidding and purchasing program that allows schools, libraries, government entities and non-profit agencies to save money on technology purchases
 Statewide prevention and intervention initiatives
Cyber Charter School - grades 9-12th
State mandated preemployment finger printing
Gifted Education Networking Services
Education services to Incarcerated Youth
Migrant Education Support
Northumberland Area Early Head Start and Head Start federally funded preschool programs
Educator Effectiveness Project

References

External links
 

Intermediate Units in Pennsylvania
Education in Northumberland County, Pennsylvania
Education in Snyder County, Pennsylvania
Education in Montour County, Pennsylvania
Education in Union County, Pennsylvania
Education in Columbia County, Pennsylvania
Susquehanna Valley